Jambhavali is a village in India, situated in Mawal taluka of Pune district in the state of Maharashtra.

Administration
The village is administrated by a sarpanch, an elected representative who leads a gram panchayat. At the time of the 2011 Census of India, the gram panchayat governed five villages and was based at Shirdhe.

Demographics
At the 2011 census, the village comprised 53 households. The population of 283 was split between 156 males and 127 females.

Air travel connectivity 
The closest airport to the village is Pune Airport

See also
List of villages in Mawal taluka

References

Villages in Mawal taluka